"Stand by Your Man" is a song by American rapper LL Cool J, released as the final single from his fifth studio album, 14 Shots to the Dome. It was released on October 4, 1993 by Def Jam Recordings, and was produced by Marley Marl and LL Cool J. "Stand By Your Man" had the least commercial success of the four singles, only making it to number 67 on the Hot R&B/Hip-Hop Singles & Tracks and 18 on the Hot Rap Tracks. The B-side was "Soul Survivor".

"Stand by Your Man" was nominated for the Grammy Award for Best Rap Solo Performance but lost to "Let Me Ride" by Dr. Dre.

Track listing

A-side
"Stand By Your Man" (LP Version)- 4:50
"Stand By Your Man" (New Jack Street Mix)- 3:41
"Stand By Your Man" (New Jack Street Mix Instrumental)- 3:41

B-side
"Stand By Your Man" (Hip Hop Mix 2)- 3:50
"Stand By Your Man" (Hip Hop Mix 1)- 4:01
"Soul Survivor"- 4:42
"Stand By Your Man" (Accapella)- 3:39

1992 songs
1993 singles
LL Cool J songs
Def Jam Recordings singles
Songs written by LL Cool J
New jack swing songs